On September 21, 1939 radio station WJSV in Washington, D.C. made an audio recording of its entire 19-hour broadcast day. This undertaking was a collaboration between the station and the National Archives, and it was the first time that such a comprehensive recording of a radio broadcast had been made. The station then donated its original set of recording discs to the National Archives, giving it a rare and complete artifact from an era frequently called the Golden Age of Radio. Due to their historical significance, the United States Library of Congress has since added these sound recordings to its National Recording Registry.

Station details 
In 1939, station WJSV was an owned-and-operated member of the Columbia Broadcasting System (CBS) radio network. At that time there were four major national radio networks in the United States. In Washington, D.C. they were represented by:
(The NBC Blue network would soon be split off and then later become the American Broadcasting Company (ABC))

Preliminary planning 
The idea of recording WJSV's entire broadcast day from sign-on to sign-off grew out of ongoing talks between members of the National Archives and station WJSV. Before this project took place members of the National Archives such as John Bradley, the chief of the Division of Motion Pictures and Sound Recordings, and R. D. W. Connor, the Archivist of the United States, discussed the matter with the staff at WJSV, including Ann Gillis, WJSV Publicity Director, and Harry C. Butcher, Vice-President in Charge of the CBS Washington Office. It was agreed that WJSV would record the broadcast at their studio and then donate the finished product to the files of the National Archives.

Method of recording the day 
In 1939, the standard way to make an audio recording of a live radio broadcast was by cutting an instantaneous transcription disc, since audio tape recording had not yet been perfected. The typical disc used in this situation was a double-sided 16-inch (41 cm.) platter which could record approximately fifteen minutes of audio on each side. A major advantage of cutting an instantaneous disc, as opposed to making a record, was that the disc did not need any further processing to be playable, although unlike a finished record this disc was so soft it would wear out after a few plays. By late 1939 transcription discs were being used fairly commonly in the industry, even though the networks still aired the majority of their programs live. However many performers and sponsors were using transcription discs to record their own shows, thus allowing them to later review their programs. And NBC's nighttime series Information Please had just begun recording its shows onto instantaneous discs so that the program could be re-aired later that night on the West Coast.
But nearly all of the programs being recorded ran for only fifteen or thirty minutes, and rarely for more than one hour. Since a disc could only record about fifteen minutes on each side, the job of recording an entire 19-hour broadcast day would require 38 16-inch discs. It would also require having somebody available every fifteen minutes to set up and execute each transcription, and to perform this task a somewhat daunting seventy-six consecutive times over a nineteen-hour period.

Overview of broadcast day 
WJSV's broadcast day on Thursday, September 21, 1939 included both the typical and the exceptional. Almost everything that aired was live, and if not it was identified as being "recorded" or "transcribed." This day began as usual with  hours of local programming which featured a mixture of news, talk, commercials and recorded music, much of which was presided over by Arthur Godfrey who would soon become a famous national radio (and later television) personality. The day continued into the early afternoon with a succession of 15-minute programs, mainly "serial dramas" supplied by the CBS network. These dramas were characteristically introduced by the sounds of an electric organ, and so many of these shows had a soap product as their  sponsor that they were already being collectively dubbed "soap operas". In the evening the schedule line-up switched to mostly longer-form network entertainment programs, offering up comedy, drama, and variety shows, along with some more serious programming. Then late at night the network provided a series of 30-minute orchestra band remotes, usually featuring big bands, from various locations across the country. In addition, news reports were presented throughout the day.

Typical of most radio stations, WJSV also aired some of its own shows, and these local programs would either delay or replace the programs being offered by the CBS network. For example, in its 8:30 a.m. timeslot WJSV ran a locally produced quiz program hosted by John Charles Daly, who was engaged in one of his first quiz show undertakings. Also typical was the number of schedule adjustments that the station had to make during the day, and newspaper radio listings often noted that schedules were subject to last-minute changes. The adjustments required on this day ranged from dealing with technical difficulties to managing the schedule changes which were both occurring locally and coming down from the network. For example, on this day WJSV aired an afternoon Washington Senators baseball game, and the CBS network offered several special broadcasts during the day for the local stations to consider airing.

The most important special broadcast on this day, and the primary reason why this day was chosen for recording, was the live nationwide broadcast of President Franklin Roosevelt's speech that afternoon to a special joint session of Congress, which was taking place against the backdrop of the beginning of World War II. In light of the events, President Roosevelt was calling for the repeal of the current arms embargo provisions of the country's Neutrality Acts. In exchange he proposed adding a provision, commonly dubbed "cash-and-carry," which would again allow belligerent nations to buy munitions from the United States, but only if they paid cash at the time of purchase and then used their own ships to transport these purchases back home. Opponents argued that any modifications of the Neutrality Acts could be a first step in drawing the United States into another war.

The importance of this event was appreciated at the time, and WJSV newscaster Hugh Conover cited it during his 1:00 p.m. Sunshine Reporter newscast as the reason that this particular broadcast day was selected for recording:

A recording, covering a full day of broadcasting at station WJSV, is going to be placed in the files of the National Archives. The special recording is being made today, and this program to which you are now listening is now being recorded and preserved for posterity. The full day's activities, from the opening station announcement at 6:00 o'clock this morning until 1:00 a.m., when "The Star-Spangled Banner" is played, will be recorded. Today was chosen for the record because history will be made in the United States this afternoon. The recording will include the opening of the extra session of Congress and President Roosevelt's speech to that body. Arrangements are also being made to include a speech by Premier Daladier, direct from France, in case President Roosevelt's speech is finished on time.

Legacy 
The original set of broadcast recording discs went to the National Archives. Numerous other sites, such as the non-profit website Internet Archive now have copies of these recordings, and these have proven popular with fans of old-time radio, both for their entertainment value and for offering a unique historical record. They offer what is often the only example of some of the shows, performances, and personalities from this period.

In early 2004 the United States Library of Congress announced that the WJSV transcriptions had been chosen as one of the sound recordings selected to its National Recording Registry for 2003.

WJSV broadcast day schedule 
WJSV signed on at 6:00 a.m. Eastern Daylight Time on Thursday, September 21, 1939, with the opening announcement:

Good morning. This is station WJSV, owned and operated by the Columbia Broadcasting System, with studios in the Earle Building at 13th and E Streets, NW, in the City of Washington. Our transmitting facilities are on the Mount Vernon Memorial Boulevard in historic Alexandria, Virginia, on property leased from the Richmond, Fredericksburg and Potomac Railway company. Station WJSV operates on a frequency of 1460 kilocycles by authority of the Federal Communications Commission.

Note: All times are Eastern Daylight Time.
Local WJSV programming is highlighted in yellow. CBS network-sourced programming is highlighted in green.

References

External links
 Audio files of the WJSV complete broadcast day at the Internet Archive website.
 The Columbia Program Book (September 1939) at the American Radio History website.
 The Columbia Program Books (October and November 1939) at the American Radio History website.

1939 in radio
Radio in the United States
United States National Recording Registry recordings